Bowen, Colorado may refer to:

 Bowen, Las Animas County, Colorado
 Bowen, Rio Grande County, Colorado